This is a list of species in Melissodes, a genus of long-horned bees in the family Apidae.

Melissodes species

 Melissodes ablusus Cockerell, 1926
 Melissodes agilis Cresson, 1878  (agile long-horned bee)
 Melissodes apicatus Lovell & Cockerell, 1906
 Melissodes appressus LaBerge, 1961
 Melissodes baileyi Cockerell, 1906
 Melissodes bicoloratus LaBerge, 1961
 Melissodes bidentis Cockerell, 1914
 Melissodes bimaculatus Lepeletier, 1825  (two-spotted longhorn)
 Melissodes bimatris LaBerge, 1961
 Melissodes blandus LaBerge, 1956
 Melissodes boltoniae Robertson, 1905
 Melissodes brevipyga LaBerge, 1961
 Melissodes bruneri (Cockerell, 1918)
 Melissodes cerussatus LaBerge, 1961
 Melissodes cestus Krombein, 1953
 Melissodes clarkiae LaBerge, 1961
 Melissodes colliciatus Cockerell, 1910
 Melissodes coloradensis Cresson, 1878
 Melissodes comatus LaBerge, 1961
 Melissodes communis Cresson, 1878  (common long-horned bee)
 Melissodes compositus Tucker, 1909
 Melissodes comptoides Robertson, 1898  (brown-winged long-horned bee)
 Melissodes confusus Cresson, 1878
 Melissodes coreopsis Robertson, 1905
 Melissodes crocinus LaBerge, 1961
 Melissodes cubensis LaBerge, 1956
 Melissodes dagosa Cockerell, 1909
 Melissodes denticulatus Smith, 1854
 Melissodes dentiventris Smith, 1854
 Melissodes desponsus Smith, 1854  (thistle long-horned bee)
 Melissodes druriellus (Kirby, 1802)
 Melissodes ecuadorius Bertoni & Schrottky, 1910
 Melissodes elegans LaBerge, 1961
 Melissodes exilis LaBerge, 1961
 Melissodes expolitus LaBerge, 1961
 Melissodes fasciatellus LaBerge, 1961
 Melissodes fimbriatus Cresson, 1878
 Melissodes flexus LaBerge, 1956
 Melissodes floris Cockerell, 1896
 Melissodes foxi Crawford, 1915
 Melissodes fumosus LaBerge, 1961
 Melissodes gelidus LaBerge, 1961
 Melissodes gilensis Cockerell, 1896
 Melissodes glenwoodensis Cockerell, 1905
 Melissodes grindeliae Cockerell, 1898
 Melissodes haitiensis LaBerge, 1961
 Melissodes humilior Cockerell, 1903
 Melissodes hurdi LaBerge, 1961
 Melissodes hymenoxidis Cockerell, 1906
 Melissodes illatus Lovell & Cockerell, 1906
 Melissodes interruptus LaBerge, 1961
 Melissodes intortus Cresson, 1872
 Melissodes labiatarum Cockerell, 1896
 Melissodes leprieuri Blanchard, 1849
 Melissodes limbus LaBerge, 1961
 Melissodes lupinus Cresson, 1878
 Melissodes lustra LaBerge, 1961
 Melissodes lutulentus LaBerge, 1961
 Melissodes maestus LaBerge, 1956
 Melissodes manipularis Smith, 1854
 Melissodes martinicensis Cockerell, 1917
 Melissodes melanurus (Cockerell, 1916)
 Melissodes menuachus Cresson, 1868
 Melissodes metenua Cockerell, 1924
 Melissodes micheneri LaBerge, 1961
 Melissodes microstictus Cockerell, 1905
 Melissodes mimicus Cresson, 1869
 Melissodes minusculus LaBerge, 1961
 Melissodes mitchelli LaBerge, 1956
 Melissodes monoensis LaBerge, 1961
 Melissodes montana Cresson, 1878
 Melissodes moorei Cockerell, 1926
 Melissodes morrilli Cockerell, 1918
 Melissodes negligendus Cockerell, 1949
 Melissodes nigracauda LaBerge, 1961
 Melissodes nigroaeneus (Smith, 1854)
 Melissodes niveus Robertson, 1895
 Melissodes ochraea LaBerge, 1961
 Melissodes opuntiellus Cockerell, 1911
 Melissodes pallidisignatus Cockerell, 1905
 Melissodes panamensis Cockerell, 1928
 Melissodes paroselae Cockerell, 1905  (parosela long-horned bee)
 Melissodes paucipuncta LaBerge, 1961
 Melissodes paululus LaBerge, 1961
 Melissodes perlusus Cockerell, 1925
 Melissodes perpolitus LaBerge, 1961
 Melissodes persimilis Cockerell, 1949
 Melissodes personatellus Cockerell, 1901
 Melissodes pexus LaBerge, 1961
 Melissodes pilleatus LaBerge, 1961
 Melissodes plumosus LaBerge, 1961
 Melissodes pullatellus LaBerge, 1961
 Melissodes pullatus Cresson, 1865
 Melissodes raphaelis Cockerell, 1898
 Melissodes relucens LaBerge, 1961
 Melissodes rivalis Cresson, 1872
 Melissodes robustior Cockerell, 1915  (robust long-horned bee)
 Melissodes rufipes LaBerge, 1961
 Melissodes rufodentatus Smith, 1854
 Melissodes saponellus Cockerell, 1908
 Melissodes scotti Cockerell, 1939
 Melissodes semilupinus Cockerell, 1905
 Melissodes sexcinctus (Lepeletier, 1841)
 Melissodes snowii Cresson, 1878
 Melissodes sonorensis LaBerge, 1963
 Melissodes sphaeralceae Cockerell, 1896
 Melissodes stearnsi Cockerell, 1905
 Melissodes subagilis Cockerell, 1905
 Melissodes subillatus LaBerge, 1961
 Melissodes submenuacha Cockerell, 1897
 Melissodes tepaneca Cresson, 1878  (tepanec long-horned bee)
 Melissodes tepidus Cresson, 1878
 Melissodes terminatus LaBerge, 1961
 Melissodes tescorum LaBerge, 1963
 Melissodes tessellatus LaBerge, 1956
 Melissodes thelypodii Cockerell, 1905
 Melissodes tibialis (Fabricius, 1804)
 Melissodes tinctus LaBerge, 1961
 Melissodes tintinnans (Holmberg, 1884)
 Melissodes tribas LaBerge, 1961
 Melissodes trifasciatus Cresson, 1878
 Melissodes trinodis Robertson, 1901
 Melissodes tristis Cockerell, 1894
 Melissodes tuckeri Cockerell, 1909
 Melissodes utahensis LaBerge, 1961
 Melissodes velutinus (Cockerell, 1916)
 Melissodes verbesinarum Cockerell, 1905
 Melissodes vernalis LaBerge, 1961
 Melissodes vernoniae Robertson, 1902
 Melissodes wheeleri Cockerell, 1906

References

Melissodes